Verneuil d'Avre et d'Iton (literally Verneuil of Avre and of Iton) is a commune in the department of Eure, northern France. The municipality was established on 1 January 2017 by merger of the former communes of Verneuil-sur-Avre (the seat) and Francheville. Verneuil-sur-Avre station has rail connections to Argentan, Paris and Granville.

Population

See also 
Communes of the Eure department

References 

Communes of Eure